Higher education in Norway is offered by a range of ten universities, nine specialised universities (focused on a specific program area), 24 university colleges as well as a range of private university colleges.  The national higher education system is in accordance with the Bologna process, with bachelor's degrees (first cycle, three years), master's degrees (second cycle, two years) and doctoral degrees (third cycle, three years). Acceptance is offered after finishing upper secondary school and meeting general university admissions certification.

Public education is free for citizens from any country that is part of EU, the European Economic Area or Switzerland, but everyone else needs to pay a tuition fee to the university. The tuition fee can range from 80,000 NOK to 400,000 NOK per academic year.

The higher education in Norway is divided into an academic year with two semesters, from August to December and from January to June. The ultimate responsibility for the education lies with the Norwegian Ministry of Education and Research.

System

Admission
Acceptance to higher education requires either fulfilled three years of upper secondary school with general university admissions certification. This is awarded non-vocational students or vocational students who choose to not take their apprenticeship. Conversely study competence can be achieved by the so-called 23/5 rule where applicants must be 23 years of age and have a total of five years of upper secondary education and work experience as well as have passed courses in Norwegian, English, mathematics, science and social studies. To be accepted as certain lines (for instance engineering) advanced courses in mathematics, physics and chemistry must be passed.

Admission to bachelor level programs is coordinated through the Norwegian Universities and Colleges Admission Service based on a point scale, with the highest ranking students offered a place. Points are awarded based on average grades from upper secondary school, but additional points are awarded students with secondary two-year course specialization, science specialization, age and fulfilled one year of higher education, military service or folk high school. Secondary school grades can be improved to increase points, but 40% of the places are only offered based on original transcripts without age or study points.

Structure

In 2003 a national reform, called the Quality reform, was implemented throughout the entire national higher education system. Norway was one of the first countries in Europe to implement the Bologna convention, thus creating a 3+2+3 year system in accordance with the Bologna Process.

A further step was taken in 2005 when the Act Relating to Universities and University Colleges and the Private Higher Education Institutions Act were merged into one common Act, the Act relating to universities and university colleges. The common act ensures greater equality between the public and private higher education institutions, thus focusing more on the quality in higher education than ownership. The evaluation of Quality Assurance Systems at and accreditation of both public and private institutions are handled by a national agency for quality assurance, NOKUT.

First Cycle
Most students that fulfill the requirements for entrance to higher education in Norway are accepted to three-year Bachelor programs.

Second Cycle
Entrance to the two-year master programs are based upon the academic qualifications (grades) from the bachelor level.

Some programs (including architecture, business management at NHH, engineering at NTNU), Master of Dentistry and Master of Laws are five-year programs (one-tier degrees).

Three types of master's degrees are offered: Master of Science (science and business), Master of Philosophy (humanities and social studies) and Master of Technology (engineering).

Professional Degrees
Some professional oriented programs have been granted an exemption from the Bologna system. Physicians (cand.med.), veterinarians (cand.med.vet.), psychologist (cand.psychol.) and theologians (cand.theol.) are therefore still awarded degrees for six years of study.

Third Cycle
Doctor Philosophae degrees are awarded after three years of research-oriented education. Most programs also include one year of compulsory teaching as part of the education, making the total length of the program four years.

System of Grading
According to the ECTS-system the grading are given according to scale of six grades, ranging from an A to F, with A being the best and E the worst passing grade. F is a fail.

A normal study progression awards 60 credits (stp) per year (30 per semester), most institutions either use a 7.5 or a 10 credit block system.

Examinations are usually held every semester, in December and June, although exceptions occur.

Old system
Prior to 2002 the higher education in Norway had a significantly different system of education with roots back to the start of higher education in the country. It was based on a 3.5 or 4 year cand.mag. degree supplemented with a Masters or hovedfag lasting 1.5 or 2 years. Total study time was five years within sciences while it was six years within social studies and humanities. Master's degrees were named based on the line of study, for instance cand.scient. within science, cand.polit. in political studies or cand.oecon. within economics. Certain professional studies, such as medicine, law, and some engineering and business administration courses had professional studies that offered full-length degrees (without issuing cand.mag. titles). The titles awarded were cand.jur. (law, 6 years), cand.med. (medical doctor, 6 years), cand.psychol. (doctor of psychology, 6 years), siviløkonom (business administration, 4 years) or sivilingeniør (engineering, 4.5 years). NHH had a monopoly educating siviløkonoms while NTH had a monopoly educating sivilingeniørs. Doctorate studies were offered on top of the masters.

Grading was performed on a 1.0 to 4.0 system, with 1.0 as the best grade and 4.0 the worst passing grade. A total of 41 different grades could be awarded with the system. Credits (then called vekttall) were issued based on a nominal study of 20 credits per year (or 10 per semester).

Institutions

Universities
Traditionally there were only four universities in Norway, located in Oslo (since 1811), Bergen (1948), Trondheim (1968) and Tromsø (1972). Since 2005 any college offering five master programs and four doctoral programs can title themselves a university, leading to the Norwegian University of Life Sciences, Stavanger University College and Agder University College converting to universities.

The public universities of Norway are:
 Nord University (Several campuses in North Trøndelag and Nordland counties)
 Norwegian University of Life Sciences (Ås)
 Norwegian University of Science and Technology (Trondheim, Ålesund and Gjøvik)
 Oslo Metropolitan University (Oslo) (official site)
 University of Agder (Kristiansand, Grimstad and Arendal)
 University of Bergen
 University of Oslo
 University of Southeastern-Norway
 University of Stavanger
 University of Tromsø

Currently there are no private universities in Norway, although BI Norwegian Business School has tried to advance to a full university.

Specialised universities
There are six public and three private specialised universities in Norway, each functioning as a national competence centre for the field they represent. Six are located in Oslo, one is in Molde, one is in Bergen and one in Stavanger. The Norwegian Institute of Technology and the Norwegian College of Agriculture have converted to full universities.

The public specialised universities in Norway are:
Oslo School of Architecture and Design, or Arkitektur- og designhøgskolen i Oslo (official site)
Molde University College, or Høgskolen i Molde (official site)
Norwegian School of Economics, or Norges Handelshøyskole (official site)
Norwegian School of Sport Sciences, or Norges idrettshøgskole (official site)
Norwegian Academy of Music, or Norges musikkhøgskole (official site)
Norwegian School of Veterinary Science, or Norges vetrinærhøgskole (official site)

The private specialised universities are:
MF Norwegian School of Theology, or Det teologiske Menighetsfakultet (official site)
VID Specialized University in Oslo, Stavanger, Sandness, Tromso  VID vitenskapelige høgskole (official site)

University colleges
The 23 university colleges in Norway are responsible for regional education of primarily bachelor level education within the fields of nursing, teaching, business management, engineering and information technology, though most colleges also offer a number of other academic degrees as well.

The public university colleges in Norway consist of:
Western Norway University of Applied Sciences, or Høgskolen på Vestlandet (official site)
Inland Norway University of Applied Sciences, or Høgskolen på Innlandet (official site)
Norwegian Defence University College, or Forsvarets høgskole (official site)
Norwegian Police University College, or Politihøgskolen (official site)
Oslo National Academy of the Arts, or Kunsthøgskolen i Oslo (official site)
Sámi University of Applied Sciences, or Samisk høgskole  (official site)
Volda University College, or Høgskulen i Volda (official site)
Østfold University College, or Høgskolen i Østfold (official site)

The accredited private university colleges in Norway are:
BI Norwegian Business School, or Handelshøyskolen BI Dronning Mauds Minne Høgskole 
Diakonhjemmet University College, or Diakonhjemmet Høgskole (official site)
NLA University College, or NLA Høgskolen (official site)
Queen Maud University College or Dronning Mauds Minne Høgskole (official site)

Private institutions
There are a number of private higher education institutions in Norway, although the public institution cover more than ninety per cent of the student population in the country, meaning that less than ten per cent of students attend private institutions.

The private institutions offer primarily programs and courses within popular fields of study where the number of public places is limited or offering accelerated courses. However some provide specialised courses not found in the public institutions such as Noroff University College in Kristiansand.

Most of the private institutions are foundations, either autonomous (like the BI Norwegian Business School and Campus Kristiania) or part of various religious societies, like the School of Missions and Theology or Queen Maud University College.

Students attending private institutions may have to pay school fees equivalent to the entire cost of operating the education, though the Norwegian State Educational Loan Fund will grant loans to cover the tuition fees.

Student welfare and economics
There are no tuition fees for attending public higher education in Norway, as all the costs are covered by the Ministry of Education and Research.

Students are also given the opportunity to apply for financial support (a part loan/part grant) from the Norwegian State Educational Loan Fund. The main requirement for support from Fund is that you are a Norwegian citizen. However, foreign citizens may also be entitled to financial support.

Eligible applicants may be granted financial support (a part loan/part grant) of about NOK 90,000. It is initially given as a full loan, but upon completion of modules in the education around 40 percent of the amount is transferred to a scholarship/grant if the modules are passed. There is no interest paid while taking the education.

While studying, all students belong to a student welfare organisation that takes care of such services as housing, on-campus dining, book stores, kindergartens, advisory services and some health care. Part of this is finances through a student fee, typically at NOK 300–500 per semester. There are a total of 25 such organisations, each covering a geographic area and often consisting of more than one institution. The sole exception is Oslo where there are two.

Programs
The five main universities in Bergen, Oslo, Trondheim, Tromsø and Stavanger all offer a wide selection of courses within most fields, while certain minor fields have been left to the specialised universities, including veterinary studies and sports. Many educations are left to the regional colleges.

Architecture
Architecture is only offered at two public institutions, NTNU in Trondheim and the Oslo School of Architecture and Design. In addition the private college Bergen School of Architecture offers architect education. NTNU accepts students based on grades while the Oslo School accepts students based on a portfolio. Landscape architecture and area planning is offered at the Norwegian University of Life Sciences at Ås.

Business administration
Most business administrators are educated at the regional colleges throughout the country, with Bachelor programs offered in Alta, Tromsø, Narvik, Bodø, Steinkjer, Trondheim, Molde, Ålesund, Sogndal, Bergen, Haugesund, Stavanger, Kristiansand, Kongsberg, Oslo, Ås, Halden, Lillehammer, Gjøvik and Hamar. In addition NHH in Bergen is the specialised college offering the highest level of education within the field. Business administration is also offered at some private colleges, most notably the BI Norwegian Business School in Oslo.

Eight institutions offer a Master of Science in Business Administration, also granting the right to use the protected title siviløkonom. These are Bodø Graduate School of Business, Trondheim Business School, Molde University College, the Norwegian School of Economics and Business Administration, the University of Stavanger, the University of Agder, BI Norwegian Business School and the Norwegian University of Life Sciences. Until the 1980s this level of education was only offered at NHH.

Engineering
In general, three-year bachelor's degrees in engineering are offered throughout the country at the regional colleges, most dominantly within the fields of construction, chemistry, electronics and informatics, though many others also exist. Five-year Master of Technology degrees are offered as well, primarily at the Norwegian University of Science and Technology (NTNU) in Trondheim and the University of Stavanger (UiS), though also at some other institutions to a lesser degree. Candidates with three years of education can apply to attend the last two years at NTNU or UiS to complete a Master's study. All Master engineers can use the protected title sivilingeniør. NTNU offers 14 different programs in engineering, whereas UiS only offers 8 different studies in engineering.

Law
Juridical education is offered at the universities in Oslo, Bergen and Tromsø. Education lasts five years, and after that you are given the title "Master i Rettsvitenskap", meaning a legal skilled person. For becoming a lawyer you need to work as lawyer apprentice (advokatfullmektig) for at least two years and have had five cases before a judge.

Medicine
Medicine is offered at the four of the five major universities in Oslo, Bergen, Trondheim and Tromsø, who have close cooperation with the university hospitals in the cities. Medical education takes six years and still grants the old cand.med. degree. After school candidates are required 1.5 years of practice before being granted certification. After six additional years of work experience they are awarded specialist certification.

Teaching
There are two ways to become a qualified teacher in Norway. For primary and lower secondary levels a four-year general teacher education is offered at most regional colleges in the country. This education qualifies the teachers to teach all subjects offered in the lower levels of education in Norway, though it allows students to specialize in subjects. Preschool teaching is offered at some of the regional colleges too.

For upper secondary school taking a degree at a university within the appropriate subject is the preferred course of line. After taking a degree, either at Bachelor or Master level, a one-year course in pedagogy is required before teacher certification is granted. To teach a particular subject at the upper secondary level, 60 credits in the appropriate field is required, making most teachers qualified to teach two or three subjects, though these are not absolute requirements.

Sciences 
Virtually all education within the sciences are offered at the five major universities, in Bergen, Oslo, Trondheim, Tromsø and Stavanger, though some regional colleges have one-years or perhaps Bachelor programs in certain fields.

See also 
Academic ranks in Norway
List of universities in Norway

References 

Education in Norway
Norway

no:Liste over universitet og høgskoler i Norge